David Ronald Philpotts (born 31 March 1954 in Bromborough, Cheshire - now Merseyside) is a retired professional football defender from England.

Philpotts began his career with Coventry City in 1972. He played only three games with the first team over two seasons. He went on loan to Southport FC during the 1973–1974 season. In 1974, he transferred to Tranmere Rovers where he became a fixture on the back line. In 1981, he moved to the Carolina Lightnin', which was playing its first season of existence, of the American Soccer League. He was back in England with Tranmere in 1983. He ended his career with two games during the 1984–1985 season.

After retiring, he briefly managed the Wigan Athletic during part of the 1993 campaign.

He was employed as Tranmere's Chief Scout until retiring in May 2014, ending an association  with the club that lasted over 40 years.

References

1954 births
Living people
American Soccer League (1933–1983) players
Carolina Lightnin' players
Coventry City F.C. players
English footballers
English expatriate footballers
Southport F.C. players
Tranmere Rovers F.C. players
People from Bromborough
Stockport County F.C. non-playing staff
Tranmere Rovers F.C. non-playing staff
Expatriate soccer players in the United States
Association football defenders
English expatriate sportspeople in the United States